The Arusha Peace and Reconciliation Agreement, widely known as the Arusha Accords, was a transitional peace treaty signed on 28 August 2000 which brought the Burundian Civil War to an end between most armed groups. Negotiations for the agreement were mediated by former Tanzanian president Julius Nyerere from 1996 until his death in October 1999, and thereafter by former South African president Nelson Mandela.

The Accords were based on four points of agreement:
A power-sharing formula, based on an agreed formula of ethnic quotas in politics
Representation of all parties in the state bureaucracy
Constitutional restrictions to prevent any single party becoming excessively powerful
Pathways to integrate former rebels and minority groups in the Burundian armed forces.

The central tenets of the Arusha Accords were subsequently added to the 2005 Constitution of Burundi.

Notes
a.Further parties that had not participated in the talks continued to fight. CNDD-FDD continued fighting until a separate ceasefire agreement was reached in 2002 and Palipehutu-FNL reached a further ceasefire agreement in 2006.

References

External links

Arusha Peace and Reconciliation Agreement for Burundi (original text) at the Brookings Institution

2000 treaties
2000 in Burundi
Political history of Burundi
Burundian Civil War
Arusha